The French perchman is equivalent to the U.S. boom operator in film production, also called the sound assistant or boomer, but differs regarding attributions. The perchman is the production sound mixer's assistant and is in charge of the microphone placement, typically using a light and telescopic pole also called a fish pole or boom. 

Thus, the perchman places and moves the microphone "in real time" in order to pick up the voices of each actor during filming. Being a perchman involves providing the best sound quality possible to the sound mixer while, at the same time, not causing shadows or entering the camera frame. To accomplish this, the perchman works in collaboration with the camera operator and the cinematographer (who directs the camera movements and lights the scenes) and the gaffer. Other duties include the hiding of miniature wireless microphones (radio mics) on the actors, the placement of hidden auxiliary microphones, and the controlling of sound reflections by the use of furniture blankets and carpet. He readies the equipment at the beginning of each day and stores the gear when the day is "wrapped", or finished. The perchman manages the technical contingencies, allowing the production sound mixer to concentrate on the artistic side of sound recording.

References

External links 
 perchman.com, L'Annuaire des perchmans du cinéma et de la télé
 cinergie.be, Le perchman dans les métiers du cinéma sur cinergie.be

Filmmaking occupations